Phosphatidylinositol glycan anchor biosynthesis class W is a protein that in humans is encoded by the PIGW gene.

Function

Glycosylphosphatidylinositol (GPI) is a complex glycolipid that anchors many proteins to the cell surface. PIGW acts in the third step of GPI biosynthesis and acylates the inositol ring of phosphatidylinositol (Murakami et al., 2003 [PubMed 14517336]).

References

Further reading